The 2006 British Columbia Scott Tournament of Hearts, British Columbia's women's provincial curling championship, was held January 25–29 at the Williams Lake Curling Club in Williams Lake, British Columbia.  The winning team of Kelly Scott represented British Columbia at the 2006 Scott Tournament of Hearts in London, Ontario, where she went 9-2 in round robin finishing first, and went on to win the National title.

Teams

Standings

Results

Draw 1
January 25, 12:30 PM PT

Draw 2
January 25, 7:30 PM PT

Draw 3
January 26, 12:30 PM PT

Draw 4
January 26, 7:30 PM PT

Draw 5
January 27, 12:30 PM PT

Draw 6
January 27, 7:30 PM PT

Draw 7
January 28, 9:30 AM PT

Playoffs

Semifinal
January , 12:00 PM PT

Final
January , 12:00 PM PT

References

British Columbia Scott Tournament Of Hearts, 2006
2006 in British Columbia
Curling in British Columbia